Broken Bones is the eleventh studio album by the American heavy metal band Dokken. It was released in Europe on 21 September 2012 and in the US on September 25, 2012. It features session drummer Jimmy DeGrasso as Mick Brown couldn't record due to scheduling conflicts, which makes Broken Bones the first Dokken album without him and also their only album to feature bassist Sean McNabb.

Aside from the standard edition CD, a special edition was released in Europe with a thirty-minute DVD feature of the making of the album.

Broken Bones sold around 2,600 copies in the United States in its first week of release and landed at position No. 173 on the Billboard 200 chart.

Track listing

Personnel

Dokken
 Don Dokken - lead vocals, percussion, producer
 Jon Levin - guitars
 Sean McNabb - bass
 Jimmy DeGrasso - drums
 Mick Brown - drums (did not play on album, official member)

Additional musicians
 Mark Boals - backing vocals

Production
 Darian Rundall - engineer
 Bob St. John - mixing
 Tim Kelly, Mike Sutherland - additional engineering
 Wyn Davis - drum engineering, engineer and mixing on "Today"
 Chris Baseford - drum engineering
 Maor Appelbaum - mastering

Charts

External links
Official Website

References

Dokken albums
King Records (Japan) albums
2012 albums
Frontiers Records albums